The following is a list of education ministers of Jamaica since adult suffrage (1944).

 Jehoida McPherson (1945–1949)
 Joseph Malcolm (1950–1951)
 L. L. Simmonds  (1951–1953)
 Edwin Allen (1953–1955)
 Ivan Lloyd (1955–1957)
 Florizel Glasspole (1957–1962)
 Edwin Allen (1962–1972)
 Florizel Glasspole (1972–1973)
 Eli Matalon (1973–1974)
 Howard Cooke (1974–1977)
 Eric Bell  (1977–1978)
 Phyllis MacPherson-Russell (1978–1980)
 Mavis Gilmour  (1980–1986)
 Neville Gallimore (1986–1989)
 Carlyle Dunkley (1989–1992)
 Burchell Whiteman (1992–2002)
 Maxine Henry-Wilson (2002–2007)
 Andrew Holness (2007–2012)
 Ronald Thwaites (2012–2016)
 Ruel Reid (2016–2019)
 Karl Samuda (2019–2020)
 Fayval Williams (2020– )

See also
 Cabinet of Jamaica
 Ministries and Agencies of the Jamaican Government

References

Education